Cool Boarders Pocket is a Snowboarding video game developed by UEP Systems and published by SNK Playmore for the Neo Geo Pocket Color.

Gameplay 
Cool Boarders Pocket differs to other games in the Cool Boarders series. It features an isometric (overhead) view instead of a third-person perspective. The game features two play modes a free-ride mode where the player navigates an obstacle course with no restrictions until they reach the goal, and a survival mode where the player snowboards through the obstacle course until they run out of health. The game allows the player to choose one of two characters; a female or male snowboarder.

External links 
Cool Boarders Pocket review at Defunct Games

2000 video games
Neo Geo Pocket Color games
Single-player video games
SNK games
Snowboarding video games
UEP Systems games
Video games developed in Japan
Video games featuring protagonists of selectable gender